John Houston (1689 or 1690 – 1754), of Scottish-Irish heritage, immigrated from Ireland to Colonial America in the 1730s. During the voyage they learned that the ship's captain planned on robbing the wealthy passengers of their gold sovereigns. They took control of the vessel and sailed to Philadelphia. After living a number of years in Lancaster, Pennsylvania, Houston moved his family and established a plantation in what is now Rockbridge County, Virginia. His great grandson was Sam Houston.

Background
During the British Civil War, also known as the Wars of the Three Kingdoms, the Houstons and other Presbyterians immigrated from Scotland and settled in Ulster. The great migration from Scotland to Ireland occurred between 1640 and 1670. Houston descends from baronets (Sir Patrick Houstoun, 1st Baronet). Sir John Houston, a baron, built a castle near Johnstone, Scotland and received an estate near what is now known as Hughstown, in Renfrew, Scotland.

Biography
Houston, given his father's name, was born in 1689 or 1690 in the northern reaches of the Kingdom of Ireland (1542–1800). Around 1735, Houston, his wife, four sons, two daughters, and his widowed mother left Ireland for Pennsylvania; one of their seven children, James, stayed in Ireland and died there.

According to Marquis James, Sam Houston's biographer, the family left Belfast, Ireland for Pennsylvania in 1730. They and other families carried gold sovereigns on their transatlantic journey, which was rare among immigrants. The ship's master, with others, planned to steal the money. The passengers were made aware of the scheme in the mid-Atlantic and they took control of the ship, apprehended the captain and put him in chains, and navigated the ship into the port of Philadelphia. The Houstons settled in Lancaster, Pennsylvania. While in Pennsylvania, Houston's two daughters and a son, John, were married. They were Houston's three eldest children.

The family traveled along the Great Wagon Road, through the Shenandoah Valley, to Old Augusta County, Virginia (now Rockbridge County, Virginia) around 1742 or 1745, where Houston acquired Borden's Tract from Benjamin Borden for $25 for 100 acres. They traveled with other Scot-Irish Presbyterian families who intended to build churches and schools. Houston built a stockade fort that provided some safety from wild animals and Native Americans. His house was large enough to take in a number of families. A grammar school and a log meetinghouse known as the Old Providence Church, were established near the fort. The New Providence Church was established for the members who lived in the lower settlement, near Walker's and Hays' Creeks.

Houston established the Timber Ridge Plantation (now the site of Church Hill in Lexington, Virginia). He contracted with indentured servants for their labor for a specified number of years. Among the first to do so, he purchased African Americans to be his slaves, and expanded the amount of acreage and the number of enslaved people as he prospered. He served as a judge and military soldier, fighting the French and Native Americans. He became unofficially known as Squire Houston.

In 1754, he was clearing a field in Augusta, during which he set a tree on fire. The tree fell on him and he died. Houston was buried at the Old Providence Church. His son Robert took over management, as well as the gentrification, of Timber Ridge.

Personal life
He married Mary Margaret Cunningham and they had six or seven children. Their children were: Robert, Isabella, Esther, John III, Samuel, Matthew, and James.

Legacy
Sam Houston was Houston's great grandson, who descended through his grandparents Robert and Margaret Davidson Houston and his parents Samuel and Elizabeth Paxton Houston.

Notes

References

1690 births
1754 deaths
Scottish people
People from Rockbridge County, Virginia
Ulster Scots people
Plantation owners
Immigrants to the Thirteen Colonies
American slave owners
Virginia colonial people